Arthee "Art" Baltazar (born 1968) is an American comics artist and writer who currently works for DC Comics.

Career
Art Baltazar started making comic books with his self-published comic book, The Cray-Baby Adventures. Since then he has created such other comics as Gyro-Man, Captain Camel & the Space Chicken, Jimmy Dydo, Lunar Lizard, Meteor Mite, and Patrick the Wolf Boy.

Baltazar briefly worked with Warner Bros. and had a monthly comic strip in Disney Adventures Magazine titled "Gorilla Gorilla!".  Baltazar has completed a graphic novel titled The Big Amoeba for Platinum Studios.

Baltazar was the artist and co-writer with Franco Aureliani of Tiny Titans, for which the two won a 2011 Eisner Award for Best Publication for Kids. The Baltazar and Aureliani team co-wrote DC's Billy Batson and the Magic of Shazam! and the comic book adaptation of the animated TV series Young Justice. In 2011, Capstone Publishers began publishing a series of DC Super-Pets books illustrated by Baltazar. In 2012, Baltazar founded a comic book shop in Skokie, Illinois with his partner and co-owner Franco Aureliani. That same year, DC launched a new series titled Superman Family Adventures which was written and drawn by Baltazar and Aureliani.  Fuzzy, the Krypto Mouse, a character who appeared in a single story in Superboy #65 (June 1958), inspired a similar character created by Baltazar for Superman Family Adventures. In 2013, Baltazar and Aureliani launched a revival of The Green Team for DC. That series was cancelled in January 2014.

Awards
2011 Eisner Award for Best Publication for Kids for Tiny Titans.

Bibliography

Books

Capstone Publishers
 
 Ace: The Origin of Batman's Dog, 2017 - written by Steve Korte
 The Amazing Mini-Mutts, 2012 - written by Donald Lemke 
 Attack of the Invisible Cats, 2011 - written by Scott Sonneborn
 Backward Bowwow, 2011 - written by Sarah Hines Stephens
 Barnyard Brainwash, 2012 - written by John Sazaklis
 Battle Bugs of Outer Space, 2011 - written by Jane B. Mason
 The Biggest Little Hero, 2012 - written by John Sazaklis
 Candy Store Caper, 2012 - written by John Sazaklis
 The Cat Crime Club, 2012 - written by Steve Korte
 DC Super-Pets Character Encyclopedia, 2013 - written by Steve Korte 
 Deep-sea Duel, 2012 - written by John Sazaklis
 The Fantastic Flexy Frog, 2012 - written by Michael Dahl 
 The Fastest Pet on Earth, 2011 - written by J. E. Bright
 Heroes of the High Seas, 2011 - written by J. E. Bright
 The Hopping Hero, 2011 - written by John Sazaklis
 Jumpa: The Origin of Wonder Woman's Kanga, 2017 - written by Steve Korte
 Midway Monkey Madness, 2011 - written by Sarah Hines Stephens
 Night of the Scaredy Crows, 2012 - written by Sarah Hines Stephens
 Pooches of Power!, 2011 - written by Sarah Hines Stephens
 Royal Rodent Rescue, 2011 - written by John Sazaklis 
 Salamander Smackdown!, 2011 - written by John Sazaklis 
 Sleepy Time Crime, 2012 - written by Sarah Hines Stephens 
 Starro and the Space Dolphins, 2012 
 Streaky: The Origin of Supergirl's Cat, 2017 - written by Steve Korte 
 Super Hero Splash Down, 2011 - written by Jane B. Mason
 Super-Pets Showdown, 2012 - written by Sarah Hines Stephens
 Superpowered Pony, 2011 - written by Sarah Hines Stephens
 Swamp Thing vs the Zombie Pets, 2012 - written by John Sazaklis

Comic books

Action Lab Comics
 Miraculous: Adventures of Ladybug & Cat Noir: FCBD 2018 (Sami the Samurai Squirrel backup story) (2018)
 Powers in Action #1–4 (2018–2020)

Archie Comics
 World of Archie Double Digest #5 (2011)

Aw Yeah Comics! Publishing
 Aw Yeah Comics! #1–2 (2013)

Blindwolf Studios / Electric Milk Comics

 Captain Camel and the Space Chicken #1 (2001)
 Patrick the Wolf Boy #1 (2000)
 Patrick the Wolf Boy: Christmas Special 2000 #1 (2000)
 Patrick the Wolf Boy: Halloween Special #1 (2000)
 Patrick the Wolf Boy: Mother's Day Special 2001 #1 (2001)
 Patrick the Wolf Boy: Next Halloween Special 2001 #1 (2001)
 Patrick the Wolf Boy: Summer Special 2001 #1 (2001)
 Patrick the Wolf Boy: Valentine's Day Special 2001 #1 (2001)

Dark Horse Comics
 Aw Yeah Comics: Action Cat & Adventure Bug #1–4 (2016)
 Itty Bitty Hellboy #1–5 (2013) 
 Itty Bitty Hellboy: The Search for the Were-Jaguar #1–4 (2015–2016)

DC Comics

 Ambush Bug: Year None #7 (2009)
 Batman '66 #12 (2014)
 Billy Batson and the Magic of Shazam! #5–21 (2009–2010)
 Cartoon Network Action Pack #32 (2009)
 DCU Halloween Special '09 #1 (2009)
 DCU Holiday Special #1 (2009)
 FCBD 2011 Young Justice Batman BB Super Sampler #1 (2011)
 Green Lantern: Larfleeze Christmas Special #1 (2011)
 Green Lantern: The Animated Series #0, #1–3, 5–7, 9 (2012–2013)
 Green Team: Teen Trillionaires #1–8 (2013–2014)
 Harley Quinn vol. 2 #0 (2014)
 Superman Family Adventures #1–12 (2012–2013)
 Superman of Smallville graphic novel (2019)
 Super Powers vol. 4 #1–6 (2017)
 Tiny Titans #1–50 (2008–2012)
 Tiny Titans / Little Archie #1–3 (2010–2011)
 Tiny Titans:Return to the Treehouse #1–6 (2014–2015)
 Young Justice vol. 2 #1–6 (2011)

Dynamite Entertainment
 Captain Action Cat: The Timestream Catastrophe! #1–4 (2014)

Lion Forge
 Encounter #1–10 (2018–2019)

Papercutz
 Papercutz Free Comic Book Day #13 (2019)

References

External links

Official site
Blind Wolf Studios

Art Baltazar at Mike's Amazing World of Comics
Geek To Me TV: Elliott talks to Art Baltazar & Franco RedEye'' interview at YouTube

1968 births
21st-century American artists
American cartoonists
American comics artists
American comics writers
American graphic novelists
Artists from Illinois
Columbia College Chicago alumni
DC Comics people
Eisner Award winners
Living people
People from Skokie, Illinois
Writers from Illinois